Peter Shao Zhumin (born 1963) is a Chinese Catholic priest and Bishop of the Roman Catholic Diocese of Yongjia since 2016.

Biography
He was ordained a priest in 1989. He received the episcopacy with a papal mandate in December 2007. On September 7, 2016, after the death of his predecessor Vincent Zhu Wei-Fang, he became Bishop of Yongji. 

In June 2017 he was arrested by the local government.

References

1963 births
Living people
21st-century Roman Catholic bishops in China